The 1995–1996 international cricket season was from September 1995 to April 1996.

Season overview

September

Sri Lanka in Pakistan

October

Singer Champions Trophy 1995-96

South Africa in Zimbabwe

New Zealand in India

November

Pakistan in Australia

England in South Africa

December

Pakistan in New Zealand

Sri Lanka in Australia

Australian Tri-Series 1995-96

January

Zimbabwe in New Zealand

February

Wills World Cup 1995-96

March

New Zealand in the West Indies

April

Singer Cup 1995-96

Pepsi Sharjah Cup 1995-96

Sri Lanka in the West Indies

References

1995 in cricket
1996 in cricket